False Colors, also known as False Colours, is a surviving 1914 American silent drama film directed, written by and starring Lois Weber and her husband Phillips Smalley. Weber plays dual roles of a mother and her daughter.

Cast
Lois Weber as Mrs. Moore / Her daughter Flo
Phillips Smalley as Lloyd Phillips
Dixie Carr as Dixie Phillips
Adele Farrington as Mrs. Hughes, housekeeper
Charles Marriott as Butler (Mr. Hughes)
Courtenay Foote as Bert Hughes, son of Butler and Housekeeper
Herbert Standing as Marc Herbert

Production
Double exposures are used in the film to indicate transitions in scenes where Lloyd dreams of his dead wife, played by Weber, followed by the entrance of the daughter Flo, also played by Weber. Later, after his affection has shifted to his daughter, he sees Flo's image superimposed over a picture of his wife.

Preservation status
A partial print of False Colors consisting of two reels is preserved in the Library of Congress collection.

See also
List of Paramount Pictures films

References

External links

David Boardwell (2017), Observations on Film Art: Anybody But Griffith, 15 stills in lower half of article

1914 films
American silent short films
Paramount Pictures films
American black-and-white films
Silent American drama films
1914 drama films
1910s American films